The mental scale, or mental, in snakes and other scaled reptiles refers to the median plate on the tip of the lower jaw. It is a triangular scale that corresponds to the rostral of the upper jaw. The reference to the term 'mental' comes from the mental nerve which addresses the chin and lower jaw in animals. In snakes, the shape and size of this scale is sometimes one of the characteristics used to differentiate species from one another.

Related scales
 Rostral scale
 Labial scales

See also

 Snake scales
 Anatomical terms of location

References

Snake scales